The Swiss Cup was the national ice hockey cup competition of Switzerland which had been played annually from 2015 until 2021. The tournament was originally played from 1957 to 1966, then once more in 1972. On 28 May 2013, the Swiss Ice Hockey Federation announced that the cup will be revived from the 2014–15 season. At the beginning of the 2020-21 season, the SIHF announced that the 2021 edition would be the last one.

SC Bern won the final edition on February 28, 2021, against the ZSC Lions in an empty Hallenstadion.

Champions
 1957: HC Neuchâtel Young Sprinters
 1958: HC Neuchâtel Young Sprinters
 1959: Genève-Servette HC
 1960: Zürcher SC
 1961: Zürcher SC
 1962: HC Ambrì-Piotta
 1963: HC Neuchâtel Young Sprinters
 1964: EHC Visp
 1965: SC Bern
 1966: Grasshopper Club Zürich
 1972: Genève-Servette HC
 2015: SC Bern
 2016: ZSC Lions
 2017: EHC Kloten
 2018: SC Rapperswil-Jona Lakers
 2019: EV Zug
 2020: HC Ajoie
 2021: SC Bern

Titles by team

References

External links
Swiss Ice Hockey Association

Ice hockey competitions in Switzerland
National ice hockey cup competitions in Europe